The 1972 European Rowing Championships were rowing championships held at the regatta course on the Beetzsee in Brandenburg, which was then located in East Germany. There were five competitions for women only; the events for men were contested at the 1972 Summer Olympics in Munich, West Germany, instead. As World Rowing Championships were still held at four-year intervals at the time, the European Rowing Championships were open to nations outside of Europe and had become to be regarded as quasi-world championships.

It was only in March 1972 that the East German rowing association took on organising the championships that were held from 10 to 13 August 1972 and that saw entries from 20 nations. The first sixteen nations that put their nominations forward were the Soviet Union, Hungary, Romania, Bulgaria, Austria, Sweden, Poland, Denmark, Czechoslovakia, West Germany, the Netherlands, France, Great Britain, Belgium, Australia, and the host East Germany. Later registrations included the United States and New Zealand. The host country held its rowing championships at the same venue a month earlier not just to determine their national champions, but also to find the women that should get nominations for the European championships.

Medal summary – women's events

Medals table

References

European Rowing Championships
European Rowing Championships
Rowing
Rowing
Rowing